Tianliao District is a suburban district of Kaohsiung City, Taiwan.

History
After the handover of Taiwan from Japan to the Republic of China in 1945, Tianliao was organized as a rural township of Kaohsiung County. On 25 December 2010, Kaohsiung County merged with Kaohsiung City and Tianliao was upgraded to a district of the city.

Administrative divisions
The district consists of Lupu, Nanan, Datong, Tianliao, Qixing, Chongde, Xide, Sanhe, Guting and Xinxing Village.

Tourist attractions
 Agongdian Reservoir
 Chaoyuan Temple (朝元寺)
 Danantian Fude Temple (大南天福德祠)
 Lyu Family Ancient House
 Mount Matou
 Narrow Sky
 Rihyue Temple (日月禪寺)
 Shihmuru
 Shihzueizai Pavilion
 Tianliao Moon World

Notable natives
 Su Jain-rong, Minister of Finance

See also
 Kaohsiung

References

External links

 

Districts of Kaohsiung